William Byron Burdick  (October 11, 1859 – October 23, 1949) was a pitcher for Major League Baseball in the 19th century.

Sources

1859 births
1949 deaths
Baseball players from Minnesota
19th-century baseball players
Indianapolis Hoosiers (NL) players
Eau Claire Lumbermen players
Omaha Omahogs players
Omaha Lambs players
Sioux City Corn Huskers players
Minneapolis Millers (baseball) players